Elbert Dijkgraaf  (born 6 January 1970 in Almelo) is a Dutch economist and politician. He is professor at the Erasmus School of Economics where he holds the chair "Empirical economics of the public sector". He also is fellow of the Tinbergen Institute. As a member of the Reformed Political Party (Staatkundig Gereformeerde Partij) he was an MP from 17 June 2010 until 10 April 2018, when he stepped down for reasons of a familial nature. He focuses on matters of financial, economic and social affairs, infrastructure, natural environment, education and culture.

From 1999 to 2003, Dijkgraaf was chairperson of the Reformed Political Party Youth (SGP-Jongeren).

Dijkgraaf studied economics at Erasmus University Rotterdam and is a member of the Reformed Congregations. He formerly was advisor of the Noaber Foundation, the family office of Paul Baan.

In 2018 he stepped down as MP, citing tensions in his marriage. After a divorce, he entered into a relationship with Tamara van Ark, who is a politician and current Minister for Medical Care for the People's Party for Freedom and Democracy.

References 
 Parlement.com biography

External links 
 Personal homepage at Erasmus School of Economics

1970 births
Living people
Dutch columnists
Dutch economists
Erasmus University Rotterdam alumni
Academic staff of Erasmus University Rotterdam
Members of the House of Representatives (Netherlands)
People from Almelo
Dutch Calvinist and Reformed Christians
Reformed Political Party politicians
21st-century Dutch politicians